Pedro Ricardo Quintela Henriques (born 16 October 1974) is a Portuguese former footballer who played as a left-back.

He amassed Primeira Liga totals of 222 matches and six goals over 12 seasons, representing mainly Benfica and Vitória de Setúbal.

Club career
Born in Sintra, Lisbon, Henriques joined S.L. Benfica at nearly 16, from neighbouring C.F. Os Belenenses. He played six minutes in his only appearance in the 1993–94 season, a 3–0 away win against Gil Vicente FC, as his team won the Primeira Liga championship.

After a six-month loan at Vitória F.C. and the January 1997 arrival of Manuel José as coach, Henriques became a regular in the starting lineups, as Dimas had just been sold to Juventus FC. In summer 1997 he signed for FC Porto but, due to a knee injury he had contracted still at Benfica, he never appeared official for the club, and returned to Setúbal for the later part of the campaign.

In the following seven seasons, always in the top division, Henriques represented Vitória de Setúbal, Belenenses, C.D. Santa Clara and Académica de Coimbra, retiring at almost 31 years of age after additional physical problems at his last team.

Honours
Benfica
Primeira Liga: 1993–94
Taça de Portugal: 1995–96

Post-retirement
After retiring, Henriques went on to work several years as a pundit for Portuguese sport channel Sport TV.

References

External links

1974 births
Living people
People from Sintra
Sportspeople from Lisbon District
Portuguese footballers
Association football defenders
Primeira Liga players
S.L. Benfica footballers
Vitória F.C. players
FC Porto players
C.F. Os Belenenses players
C.D. Santa Clara players
Associação Académica de Coimbra – O.A.F. players
Portugal youth international footballers
Portugal under-21 international footballers